
Year 445 BC was a year of the pre-Julian Roman calendar. At the time, it was known as the Year of the Consulship of Augurinus and Philo (or, less frequently, year 309 Ab urbe condita). The denomination 445 BC for this year has been used since the early medieval period, when the Anno Domini calendar era became the prevalent method in Europe for naming years.

Events 
 By place 
 Greece 
 Pericles, concerned over the draining effect of years of war on Athenian manpower, looks for peace with the support of the Assembly. Athenian diplomat, Callias, goes to Sparta and after much bargaining arranges a peace treaty with Sparta and her Peloponnesian allies, thus extending the 5 year truce of 451 BC for another 30 years. According to this treaty, Megara is to be returned to the Peloponnesian League, Troezen and Achaea become independent, Aegina is to become a tributary to Athens but autonomous, and disputes are to be settled by arbitration. Each party agrees to respect the alliances of the other.
 The Temple of Poseidon is completed south of Athens at Cape Sunion.

 Roman Republic 
 A new law, the Lex Canuleia removes the ban on inter-marriage of the Roman classes, i.e. plebeian with patrician.
 The Plebeians demand the right to stand for election as consul but the Roman senate refused to grant them this right. Ultimately, a compromise is reached, and consular command authority is granted to Consular Tribunes ("Military Tribunes with Consular powers" or tribuni militares consulari potestate).

Births 
 Antisthenes, Athenian philosopher (d. c. 365 BC)

Deaths

References